Franchise Hockey Manager (FHM), is a text-based ice hockey simulation video game for career, historical, and fictional play developed and published by Out of the Park Developments. "FHM creates a management simulator that offers total, believable depth in managing a hockey franchise," PopMatters said in a review.

FHM's publisher, OOTP Developments, is well-known as the company behind the long-running series Out of the Park Baseball.

Games

History

First versions

The first version of Franchise Hockey Manager (FHM) was released in 2011, it was developed by Out of the Park Developments. The game was initially released for PC, but later versions have also been made available for mobile devices.

The first version of FHM allowed players to take control of a professional hockey team as the general manager. Players could make roster moves, set lineups, and make trades, all while trying to lead their team to success on the ice and financially. The game featured a realistic simulation engine that took into account many factors such as player ratings, team strategies, and league rules to create a realistic representation of the sport. The game included real-life players and teams, and the player could play games or simulate the seasons.

The initial version of the game was well-received by fans of hockey and management simulation games, and it was considered a solid starting point for the series. Out of the Park Developments continued to improve and expand upon the game with each new version, adding new features and improvements.

The first version, Franchise Hockey Manager 2014 (FHM 2014), was released on September 3, 2013. It featured 19 leagues from around the world,  It also included historical NHL play back to 1947 and the entire 1970s history of the WHA.

"The amount of detail involved is great -- they have rosters and prospects for all NHL teams, but also for junior and European leagues -- and it's still fun to mix and match line combinations," wrote The Sports Network columnist Scott Cullen in a column on Oct. 2, 2013.

A major update to the game, released on March 9, 2014, included: new training, scouting, and staff/personnel systems; four new leagues in the US, Switzerland, Asia, and Finland; a new blind mode; and many fixes and improvements. With that release, the game now had 23 leagues.

FHM 2 was released on September 28, 2015 on Mac and PC. The new version allows the user to take control of a team in any of 21 leagues from around the world, including the NHL, KHL, Canadian leagues, minor leagues in the US, leagues in the UK, leagues in Sweden and Finland, and more. Players can also play any historical NHL or WHA season back to 1931 or create a custom fictional setup. FHM 2 also contains a new game engine, a revamped tactics system and support for league expansion.

Like its cousin, Out of the Park Baseball, FHM puts players in the role of a general manager and coach: They sign free agents, trade players, set up strategies, decide on lines, and more.

FHM 2 has been noted as being a large improvement over its predecessor.

"When all's said and done, Franchise Hockey Manager 2 is a big step up from its predecessor. Those who have stuck by the developer and go out and purchase this game having previously owned FHM 2014 will find a much more polished game this time around. They will also be pleased with the care and attention the team have given to the database, game modes and options, and the sheer number of teams and players available from the get go," wrote The Digital Fix.

Later editions

Development

In an April 3, 2014 interview conducted by Bryan Calhoun, who co-hosts the Got Game show on the Sportsnet AM 590 radio station in Toronto, for the Sportsnet web site, FHM producer Jeff Riddolls explained that the game is "part of a genre of sports management games that’s very popular in Europe – Football Manager, our soccer counterpart, sells well over a million copies annually – but only has a small audience on our side of the Atlantic so far."

When Calhoun asked how the game handles the unique rules of the many leagues in the game, Riddolls explained: "It does [have them]. In some cases, though, those rules are a little difficult to model within the game - the limitations on the use of 15-year-olds in major junior, for example. So we occasionally have to handle them in an abstract way or leave a rule out if it just won’t work in a game setting, but for the most part we try to have the league rules work as accurately as possible."

Riddolls also confirmed that like OOTP Developments' other major title, Out of the Park Baseball, FHM will be an annual release.

References

External links 
 Official website

2013 video games
Hockey video games
MacOS games
Sports management video games
Video game franchises
Video games developed in Germany
Windows games